Broczyno  is a village in the administrative district of Gmina Czaplinek, within Drawsko County, West Pomeranian Voivodeship, in north-western Poland.

A historic Gothic Revival palace is located in Broczyno. The village also has an elementary school and a Catholic church.

References

External links
 Jewish Community in Broczyno on Virtual Shtetl

Broczyno